"Crown" is a song by English rapper Stormzy, released on 21 June 2019 as the second single from his second studio album, Heavy Is the Head. It debuted at number five on the UK Singles Chart dated 28 June 2019 and peaked at number four the following week.

Promotion
Stormzy revealed the song on 19 June, posting a picture with the caption "Where words fail, music speaks."

Personnel
Credits adapted from Tidal.

Vocals
 Stormzy – primary artist
 LJ Singers – choir
 Lawrence Johnson – choral backing vocals, choir arranger
 Margo Muzangaza – choral backing vocals
 Patricia Scott – choral backing vocals
 Rachael Sanniez – choral backing vocals
 Tarna-Renae Johnson – choral backing vocals
 Wayne Hernandez – choral backing vocals
 Wendi Rose – choral backing vocals

Technical
 Jimmy Napes – production
 MJ Cole – production, drum programming, engineering, keyboards
 Duncan Fuller – engineering
 Gus Pirelli – recording
 Mark "Spike" Stent – mixing
 Matt Wolach – mixing
 Michael Freeman – mixing
 Stuart Hawkes – mastering

Charts

Weekly charts

Year-end charts

Certifications

References

2019 singles
2019 songs
Stormzy songs
Songs written by Stormzy
Songs written by Jimmy Napes